Umbraculidae are a taxonomic family of unusual sea snails or limpets, marine opisthobranch gastropod molluscs in the clade Umbraculida.

Distribution
This family has a global distribution in tropical and subtropical seas.

Genera
Genera within the family Umbraculidae include:
 Spiricella Rang, 1828
 Umbraculum Schumacher, 1817
Genera brought into synonymy
 Gastroplax Blainville, 1819: synonym of Umbraculum Schumacher, 1817
 Umbrella Lamarck, 1819: synonym of Umbraculum Schumacher, 1817

References

 
 Powell A. W. B., New Zealand Mollusca, William Collins Publishers Ltd, Auckland, New Zealand 1979 
 Taxonomicon info